Life was often hard for the women among the settlers arriving in Wisconsin between 1850 and 1880. They were engaged in farming, gardening, food gathering and household tasks. Their dwellings were small and uncomfortable, and ill-health was common among them.

Living conditions
Living conditions for women and their families were not ideal. Their first shelters were rough. They were often hastily built upon arrival at their new homestead, and resembled huts or shanties. The walls, roofs and floors usually had large cracks and were not always safe from the elements. There were accounts of settler’s first dwellings that described snow coming in and covering the beds overnight. These first cabins were small, commonly only 12 by 12 feet. The floor in the main room was made of split logs and there was often a second room in the attic that could be accessed by the ladder.

Farming and gardening
Life on the frontier was hard, clearing land and farming was backbreaking work, and the women had to work right alongside the men even in the hardest work. Women could help supplement their families income if they had access to livestock. Having access to milk or eggs could round out a bland diet, and many women could use the extra eggs or butter to sell or trade for other goods.

Gardening was another one of the major chores of frontier women, because the families relied on these gardens to get them through the winter. The more food a family could grow themselves, the less they would need to buy and the more comfortable their winter would be. Summer was an especially busy time for women who spent most of their daylight hours harvesting their gardens and putting up the food into storage for the long, cold winter ahead.

Another common way to get food was to forage for it. Berries were abundant in Wisconsin during the summer months and women devoted a great amount of time picking, drying and canning strawberries, currants, cranberries, raspberries, blackberries, cherries, blueberries and gooseberries. Women spent days or weeks picking the berries while they were available.

Work
Typical daily chores for pioneer women were numerous and included running the overall household, cooking, cleaning, having and raising children and helping with farm chores. These chores included feeding chickens, collecting their eggs, milking cows and churning butter, as well as doing the families sewing and meal preparation.

Health
Accidents, illness and tragedies were common on the Wisconsin frontier, and the highest rates of death among women were childbirth and causes related to childbirth and infection that stemmed from childbirth. When illness struck a family women had to rely on their own homemade medication as doctors were often to far away to do any good. Common illnesses on the frontier included headaches, cholera, malaria, measles, mumps, whooping cough and fever and ague. Other diseases included consumption (tuberculosis), lung fever, small pox and diphtheria.

References

Sources
 Jensen, Joan M. Calling This Place Home: Women on the Wisconsin Frontier, 1850-1925. St. Paul: Minnesota Historical Society Press, 2006.
 Thompson, William Fletcher. The History of Wisconsin, Volume I. Madison: State Historical Society of Wisconsin, 1973.

History of Wisconsin
Women in Wisconsin